Parallels, Events, People is documentary series on the Soviet dissident movement and 2011–13 Russian protests.

Parallels, Events, People is produced by Natella Boltyanskaya with support from the Oak Foundation and the Andrei Sakharov Foundation. The documentary series was first presented on 13 May 2014 in Memorial society.

See also 
 They Chose Freedom
 Dissenters' March
 2011–13 Russian protests

References

External links 
 
 
 Facebook page of the project

2014 television films
Russian documentary films
Documentary films about politics
Commemoration of communist crimes
Documentary films about human rights
2010s Russian-language films
2011–2013 Russian protests
Voice of America
Films about activists